The Green Book Magazine, originally titled The Green Book Album, was a magazine published from 1909 to 1921. It was published by the Story-Press Corporation (later Consolidated Magazines) as a companion to its Red Book and Blue Book magazines. For most of its run, the magazine primarily covered theater, but converted to a women's magazine for its last few years before ceasing publication in 1921.

During the time that The Green Book Magazine covered American theater the periodical contained novelizations of current plays, along with biographical articles. It also published theatrical photographs. 

From 1911, the magazine was edited by Ray Long, who also edited Red Book and Blue Book for Story-Press. Long left at the end of 1918 to become the editor of Cosmopolitan. With the August 1912 issue, he changed the name of the magazine from The Green Book Album to The Green Book Magazine.

References

External links

 Complete issues of 
 The Green Book March 1912 issue 

Defunct women's magazines published in the United States
Magazines disestablished in 1921
Magazines established in 1909
Magazines published in Chicago
Monthly magazines published in the United States
Theatre magazines